In the sport of bouldering, problems are assigned technical grades according to several established systems, which are often distinct from those used in roped climbing.  Bouldering grade systems vary widely in use and include the Hueco "V" grades (known as the V-scale), Fontainebleau technical grades, route colors, Peak District grades, and British technical grades.  Historically, the three-level "B" system and even the Yosemite Decimal System (sometimes with a "B" prepended, as in "B5.12") were also used.

Gill "B" system
The B system conceived by John Gill in the 1950s was a universal rating scheme for bouldering, having three categories:  "B1" was defined as "... the highest level of difficulty in traditional roped climbing", "B2" was harder than B1, or "bouldering level", and the grade "B3" designated a route ascended only once, although tried by others on several occasions.  When a B3 was ascended a second time, it was reclassified as a B2, or B1. Gill's idea was to attract climbers to the "new" sport of bouldering, but discourage turning that sport into a numbers race. His system depended heavily on traditional climbing standards, long before sport climbing came into existence. It was assumed that the scale would shift as traditional difficulty levels rose. Thus, e.g., a B1(1958) would be easier than a B1(1968).

The system – designed in the early days of "modern bouldering" (i.e., bouldering interpreted as a legitimate form of rock climbing to be practiced anywhere the terrain is suitable, and not simply as training or as a minor, playful divertissement) – has never been in worldwide use.  Occasionally climbers visiting bouldering destinations in North America encounter boulder problems with B ratings.  The difficulty of these problems are now commonly quantified by John Sherman's V scale.  The Gill B system is of historical interest, but has limitations in modern, competitive bouldering involving many climbers.  Gill, citing the fragmentation of his categories into "B1-", "B1+", etc., blames the decline in popularity of his B-System upon its being "against the grain of normal competitive structures, where a simple open progression of numbers or letters indicates progress."

Fontainebleau grades
In Europe the Fontainebleau grading is the most widely used. The open-ended numerical system currently ranges from to 9A and has been directly linked to a colour coded system since 1960. The colours have changed several times over the years and continue to develop, with the introduction of apple green in 2018 for the Facile grade of between children and adults. These grades are particular to Fontainebleau for the specific reason that foot technique and friction are critical. Most climbing walls require very little footwork and the V grading system works well since it relates directly to upper body strength. Indeed the majority of bouldering areas that are steep and overhanging suit the V grade perfectly, hence it is commonly adopted worldwide. In Fontainebleau, a full overall body technique is required and therefore gives reason for the development of its own particular grading system. In the very upper grades it is very easy to make comparisons, however in the lower grades (Font 6C and below) it is impossible to make a fair comparison.

Fontainebleau colours and grading link 
Since the year 2000, the colours and grades have become well established with the following used to base the grades (but there are always exceptions): 1A-1C is reserved for slabs that can be climbed without the use of hands. 2A-2C is generally yellow or green, and signify good holds and the problems that are easy enough to be done in training/approach shoes. 3A-3C (orange), are designated where technique is needed but nothing much for the arms. 4A-4C (blue), is for problems that require either specific arm or fingertip strength - and very often core strength since the footholds are often poor or sloping. 5A-5C (red), is given for problems that have a combination of fingertip and arm strength. 6A-6C (black or white), are simply desperate and mostly involve techniques particular to Fontainebleau. 7A-8C (purple), these problems are not marked on the rock but feature in the Jingowobbly guidebooks series as purple. The circuits that run through the forest and which follow painted thumb-sized numbers, will average at the grade for the colour, but may often include a few harder or easier problems than the colour suggests - especially if there are a limited number of circuits in an area and a whole circuit of one colour isn't painted.

Hueco scale
The "V" scale, devised by John 'Vermin' Sherman at Hueco Tanks State Historic Site in the 1990s, is the most widely used system in North America.  Although open-ended, the "V" system covers a range from V0 to V17. At the easier end of the scale, some use the designation "VB" (sometimes said to designate "basic" or "beginner") for problems easier than a V0.  Particularly at the lower end of the scale, the grades are sometimes postfixed with "+" (harder) or "−" (easier) to further distinguish the difficulty range within a single grade.  Next-wave ascents harder than the current set of top-end problems will hypothetically continue to increase numbers in the scale.

The scale is similar to many other systems in that it does not take danger or fear into account.  Problems are rated based solely on the physical challenge involved.  This implies that problems have the same grade on the V-scale on toprope as they would have when bouldered.  Due to this limitation, guidebooks will often separately indicate when problems are dangerous for various reasons, for example, using the term 'highball' to indicate unusually tall boulders.  If the terrain underneath the problem is especially sketchy (rocky, unusually steep, or for any other reason), the 'landing' of the problem will frequently be noted.  Some world-class climbers encourage the use of the British E scale in cases where these dangers affect the difficulty of problems.

Conceptually, the "V" scale is the bouldering equivalent of the earlier Australian (Ewbank) grading system for climbing - both have the advantages of not predefining an upper limit on difficulty measurement (as happened with the original Yosemite Decimal System), nor of having artificial divisions within the range of grades (as is the case with most other grading systems that use designations such as "a", "b", "c", "d", "+", "-" etc. within a single "grade").

United Kingdom technical grades
In the UK, the system known as UK technical grades is occasionally used to rate a boulder problem. These run from 4a to 7b with steps of a, b and c before changing the initial number. This system is applied because these technical grades are used in the UK grading system for trad routes to represent the absolute difficulty of the hardest move. UK technical grades were only designed to describe the difficulty of a single move making them unsuitable for grading boulders and V or Font grades are generally used instead.

Japanese Dankyu system
Japan also has developed its own grading system widely used by the local climbers of the country, adopting the Dankyu (Dan and Kyu) system which resembles that of martial arts.  It is also called the Soroban system, meaning grading system used in Japanese abacus schools.  Like in martial arts, 1-Kyu is the hardest Kyu and it gets easier as the number ascends.  1-Kyu is the baseline grade represented by Captain Ahab in Ogawayama or Ninjagaeshi in Mitake, and is roughly equal to 6C+/7A in Fontainebleau grades or V5/V6 in Hueco scale.  Kyu is open-ended on the easier side but practically the easiest problem could be around 10-Kyu.  Dan starts from where kyu ends, Shodan (or 1-Dan) being the next grade higher than 1-Kyu, making it about 7A+/7B in Fontainebleau, V7/V8 in Hueco.  Climbing a shodan problem means the climber has reached the advanced level.  Dan gets harder as the number ascends, and is open-ended on the harder side. The Wheel of Life (V15/8C) is graded at 6-Dan. A comparison between Fontainebleau and Dankyu bouldering grades suggests that 6 kyu is equivalent to 4A/4C Fontainebleau.

Comparisons of bouldering grades
Many attempts have been made to correlate the various grading systems, comparing not only grades in different bouldering systems, but also  bouldering grades with traditional or sport climbing grades as well. Sometimes, there will be lack of agreement among boulderers on the difficulty of a particular problem using a single system, due to differences in size, reach, and other factors. That makes a consensus about equivalences among the various systems even less likely.

See also
 Grade (climbing)
 Degree of difficulty

References 

Bouldering